Sandra Abstreiter is an ice hockey goaltender who plays for the Providence Friars women's ice hockey program in NCAA hockey while attending the college as a graduate student. She was named to the German team that competed at the 2021 IIHF Women's World Championship.

Playing career

NCAA
Having not appeared in a game during the 2017–18 season, Abstreiter would make her Friars debut on October 6, 2018, at Schneider Arena versus the Bemidji State Beavers. She would need only 14 saves in a 4–3 final, as the Friars fought back from a 3-0 setback, with Neve Van Pelt scoring the game-winning goal.

In Abstreiter's final season with the Friars, the program qualified for the 2021 NCAA National Collegiate Women's Ice Hockey Tournament. Gaining the start in the tournament quarterfinals for the Friars versus the top-ranked, and eventual national champion, Wisconsin Badgers, Abstreiter assembled a valiant effort, recording 41 saves in a 3–0 loss.

Awards and honors
2020-21 Hockey East Third Team All-Star

References

German women's ice hockey goaltenders
Living people
1998 births
Providence Friars women's ice hockey players
People from Freising (district)
Sportspeople from Upper Bavaria